= DaShanne Stokes =

American sociologist

- Born: DaShanne Parker Stokes; Racine, Wisconsin, U.S.
- Education: University of South Dakota (BS); Boston University (MA); Minnesota State University (MA); University of Pittsburgh (PhD)
- Occupations: sociologist; writer; speaker; political commentator; activist
- Website: dashannestokes.com

DaShanne Stokes (born 1978) is an author, sociologist, public speaker and pundit. He speaks on politics, culture, and civil rights and is known as a progressive activist.

== Early life and education ==
DaShanne was born in Racine, Wisconsin in 1978. His mother gave birth to him when she was a teenager. He was raised in Las Vegas by adoptive parents of Lakota heritage, who he believed were his biological parents. In 1996 he began higher education at Boston University. In 1998, after moving to South Dakota, he discovered by accident that he was adopted, and he was not biologically a Native American. Stokes has a B.S. in biology from the University of South Dakota; a Master's in psychology from Boston University; an additional Master's in sociology from Minnesota State University, and a doctorate from the University of Pittsburgh in sociology.

== Career ==
In 2001 Stokes founded his own company, Indigenous Creations, which he ran until 2003.

Stokes has taught about human rights and social justice at the University of Pittsburgh.

== Personal life ==
Stokes is an Eagle Scout, and lives in Pittsburgh, Pennsylvania.
